Jameel Shah is an Indian businessman and a shoemaker. He is the founder of Shah Shoes. He is the first dance shoe designer who started the trend of making customize handcrafted dance shoes in India.
 
He shot to worldwide fame when Australian singer and songwriter and actress Kylie Minogue specially wore Shah Shoes in her Film Blue 

His TEDx talk 'Persistence, the key to success' and 'Could Cinderella's Shoemaker be from Dharavi' gained him recognition and love from people.

Book on his life titled 'Poor Little Rich Slum' written by Deepak Gandhi and Rashmi Bansal was one of the bestseller in 2013.

Early life
Shah was born at Doghra village in Darbhanga, Bihar. He  has attended a local madrasa till class 5.

Career
Shah moved to Delhi at the age of 12. He got his first job in a bag and wallet making factory. In 1999, he got the job of a security guard and worked for two years. In 2001, he went to work in Dharavi and started taking dance classes from Sandip Soparrkar. In 2006, he took a business loan and started his business. In 2007, he had founded Shah Shoes.

Choreographer Sandip Soparrkar introduced him to the world of Bollywood and gave him his first break as a Dance Shoes Designer and from that day there was no looking back for his brand 

Shoes designed by Jameel are an integral part of Dance Reality shows like - Dance India Dance, Jhalak Dikhhla Jaa, Dance Deewane, Dancing Queen, Nach Baliye.

Musicals like Beauty and the Beast, Aladdin, Balle Balle, Jannat Central and many more have shoes by Jameel Shah.

Clients
Who is who from the world of Bollywood films are his clientele - Katrina Kaif, Priyanka Chopra, Madhuri Dixit, Ajay Devgan, Hrithik Roshan, Virat Kohli, Anushka Sharma, Aamir Khan, Bipasha Basu, Kangana Ranaut, Tara Sutaria, Nora Fatehi, Alia Bhatt, Shilpa Shetty, Karishma Kapoor, Kareena Kapoor, Dino Morea, Smiley Suri, Ranbir Kapoor, Ranvir Singh, Kashmera Shah, Kajol, Sonali Bendre, Ameesha Patel, Aishwarya Rai Bachchan, Kriti Sanon

Super Models of India like Jesse Randhawa, Alesia Raut, Dipannita Sharma Diandra Soares also wear shoes designed by Shah Shoes.

Choreographers Like Farah Khan, Sandip Soparrkar, Terence Lewis, Punit Pathak, Salman Yusuff Khan, Dharmesh Yelande, Shakti Mohan, Alisha Singh, Nishant Bhatt, Longinus Fernandes wear as well as promote the brand Shah Shoes all over the world.

Awards
2004 - He was in the Limca Book of Records for his non-stop dance for 55 hours and 20 mins in Goa.
2007 - Boogie Woogie Latin Dance Challenge 2nd Runners up
2008 - Bronze Medal at All India DanceSport Federation (AIDSF) championship   
2009 - Gold Medal at All India DanceSport Federation (AIDSF) championship 
2010 - Silver Medal at All India DanceSport Federation (AIDSF) championship 
2013 - Universal Brotherhood Award, by Nagpur Masonic Fraternity  
2016 - Aaj ki Delhi Award 
2020 - Humanity First Foundation (HFF), A Human Rights Organisation, Achievement Award
2022 - WOW Mhasha Award, outstanding celebrity shoe designer

References

Living people
Businesspeople from Bihar
Year of birth missing (living people)